Defending champion Novak Djokovic defeated Andy Murray in the final, 6–3, 5–7, 6–4 to win the singles tennis title at the 2017 Qatar Open. Djokovic saved five match points en route to the title, in the semifinals against Fernando Verdasco.

Murray became the first player to reach the ATP Qatar Open final four times; however, his loss in the final ended his 28-match winning streak dating back to the 2016 Davis Cup semifinals.

Seeds

Draw

Finals

Top half

Bottom half

Qualifying

Seeds

Qualifiers

Qualifying draw

First qualifier

Second qualifier

Third qualifier

Fourth qualifier

References

External links
 Main Draw
 Qualifying Draw

Singles